Jack Samuel Lawrence Hinchy (born 30 January 2003) is an English professional footballer who plays as a midfielder for the academy of Brighton & Hove Albion.

Career

Stockport County
Hinchy started his career at Stockport County, progressing through the academy and signing his first professional contract in February 2021. He made his debut for Stockport in an FA Cup tie against West Ham United.

Brighton & Hove Albion
In August 2021, Hinchy moved to the academy of Premier League side Brighton & Hove Albion. He made his senior debut for the Albion a year later on 24 August 2022, replacing Tariq Lamptey in the 80th minute of the 3–0 EFL Cup second round victory over League One side Forest Green Rovers.

Career statistics

Notes

References

2003 births
Living people
English footballers
Association football midfielders
Stockport County F.C. players
Brighton & Hove Albion F.C. players